Prapancham is a 1971 Indian Malayalam-language film, directed and produced by Sudin Menon. The film stars Sudev, Sunitha, Ramu and K. N. P. Nambiar. The film's score was composed by Dulalsen.

Cast
Sudev as Rajan
Sunitha as Thankamma
Ramu as Kittu Aashaan
K. N. P. Nambiar as Appan Thamburan
T. K. Janardhanan as Gopalan Mason
Kalathur G. K. as Shankaran
C. R. Lakshmi as Narayani Amma
Sumesh as Unni

Soundtrack
The music was composed by Dulalsen with lyrics by P. Bhaskaran.

References

External links
 

1971 films
1970s Malayalam-language films